Captain of the Gray Horse Troop is a 1917 American silent Western film directed by William Wolbert and starring Antonio Moreno, Edith Storey and Otto Lederer.

Cast
 Antonio Moreno as Capt. George Curtis
 Edith Storey as Elsie
 Mrs. Bradbury as Jennie
 Otto Lederer as Crawling Elk
 Al J. Jennings as Cut Finger
 Neola May as Cut Finger's Wife
 Bob Burns as Cal Streeter
 Henry A. Barrows as Ex-Sen. Brisbane

References

Bibliography
 John T. Weaver. Twenty Years of Silents, 1908-1928. Scarecrow Press, 1971.

External links
 

1917 films
1917 Western (genre) films
American black-and-white films
Films directed by William Wolbert
Silent American Western (genre) films
Vitagraph Studios films
1920s English-language films
1910s English-language films
1910s American films